Gurudev: On the Plateau of the Peak is a biography of Ravi Shankar, a spiritual leader and founder of The Art of Living Foundation. The author of the book is his sister Bhanumathi Narasimhan.

Overview
Gurudev: On the Plateau of the Peak is about the life of Sri Sri Ravi Shankar from his childhood days to the days spent by him in the company of saints as a teenager, from being a young meditation teacher to a revered spiritual master.
 		
The book begins with the story of the historic peace negotiations with the FARC in Havana, Cuba resulting in the FARC's new vision of non-violence. Tracing back to the beginning, the book jumps to Sri Sri Ravi Shankar's birth and tells about his childhood's incidents and also describes how his decision to take sanyas was received by his family.

His decision to start on his own, the creation of Sudarshan Kriya, his transformative art of breathing, his early teaching days, the beginning of The Art of Living ashram, his travels to various countries teaching The Art of Living programs to people from diverse walks of life, his choice to venture into the red zone in Iraq and the no-man's land in Sri Lanka to bring trauma relief, the promotion of yoga and meditation as a universal solution for healing and physical and mental peace, the World Cultural Festival where he brought together close to 3.5 million people in New Delhi, India in March 2016 to celebrate human values – the book shares anecdotes and insights associated with his life choices as a spiritual master and humanitarian.

Editions
The book has been published in English in 2018 by Westland Publications. It has been translated into Hindi, Tamil, Bulgarian, Lithuanian, Marathi, Bengali, Kannada, Spanish (9789874177063), Portuguese (9788561634209), Chinese (9789671687109) and Bahasa (9789386850577).

Author
Bhanumathi Narasimhan was born in Papanasam, Tamil Nadu.

References

Books about spirituality
Biographies (books)
2018 non-fiction books
Westland Books books